The Girl from Woolworth's is a 1929 American pre-Code romance film directed by William Beaudine and starring Alice White, Gladden James and Bert Moorhouse. It was released both as a sound film and in a slightly shorter silent version.

Karen Plunkett-Powell wrote in her book, Remembering Woolworth's: A Nostalgic History of the World's Most Famous Five-and-Dime: "First National Pictures produced this 60-minute musical as a showcase for up-and-coming actress Alice White." White had the role of a singing clerk in the music department of a Woolworth's store.

Cast
 Alice White as Pat King  
 Gladden James as Dowling 
 Bert Moorhouse as Dave  
 Patricia Caron as Cleo  
 William Orlamond as Pa Donnelly  
 Milla Davenport as Ma Donnelly 
 Charles Delaney as Bill Harigan 
 Ben Hall as Jerry Donelly 
 Wheeler Oakman as Lawrence Mayfield

Status
The film is now considered lost.

References

Bibliography
 Marshall, Wendy L. William Beaudine: From Silents to Television. Scarecrow Press, 2005.

External links

1929 films
American romance films
American black-and-white films
1920s romance films
Lost American films
Films directed by William Beaudine
Warner Bros. films
F. W. Woolworth Company
1920s English-language films
1920s American films